Daehan Theological Seminary is a seminary providing training for prospective members of South Korea's Presbyterian clergy.  The campus is located in Anyang City, Gyeonggi province.  The current president is Lee Seon (이선).

Academics

Much of the graduate training is devoted to the M.Th. and M.Div. degrees, which are targeted to future ministers.  However, departments of Social Welfare and Administration provide some alternative courses of study.

History

The school shares its origin with Anyang University. The seed of both schools was planted in the Presbyterian Seminary established at Namdaemun Church in Seoul in 1948 by Yoon Pil Seong and others.  Daehan Theological Seminary was not opened as a separate institution until 1998, at which time it offered the Master of Divinity (M.Div.) degree. In 2000, it began to offer the Master of Theology (Th.M.) degree as well.

See also
List of colleges and universities in South Korea
Education in South Korea

External links 
 Official school website, in Korean

Universities and colleges in Gyeonggi Province
Seminaries and theological colleges in South Korea
Anyang, Gyeonggi
1948 establishments in Korea
Educational institutions established in 1948